Season 3. Hideout: Be Our Voice is the third extended play by South Korean boy group Cravity. It was released on January 19, 2021, by Starship Entertainment and distributed by Kakao M.

The EP was a commercial success, peaking at number three on the weekly Gaon Album Chart and at number 12 on the Oricon weekly album chart. It is their first album to miss the top spot on the former chart, and their second best charting album on the latter.

Singles
"My Turn" is the title track of the EP. The song entered and peaked at number 21 on the Gaon Download Chart on the chart issue dated week of January 17-23, 2021 and fell at number 82 on the following week of January 24–30, 2021. 

The song became their first top-40 hit on the chart, and also their longest charting song as well as their first entry on the monthly update of the chart when it peaked at number 112.

Promotion
Music show promotions for "My Turn" began on January 22, 2021, on KBS's Music Bank. The B-side track "Mammoth" was also performed during the first week of promotions. 

A performance video for their B-side track "Bad Habits" was released on March 11, 2021, with promotions beginning the following day on March 12 on KBS's Music Bank as a follow-up to the group's initial promotions for the album.

Commercial performance
Season 3. Hideout: Be Our Voice entered and peaked at number 3 on the Gaon Album Chart on the chart issue dated week of January 17–23, 2021. In its second week, the EP fell on #5 and was ranked #14 on its third week.

The EP shipped 112,301 copies at the end of January, charting at #5 on the Gaon Monthly Album Chart and was ranked #30 on the month of February with 17,970 copies shipped accounting to a total of 130,271 copies sold. On its third monthly update on Gaon, the EP rose 14 spots and was ranked #16 with 31,865 copies shipped accumulating to a total of 162,136 total copies sold for the EP.

Track listing
Credits adapted from Melon.

Charts

Weekly charts

Year-end charts

Release history

References

2021 EPs
Cravity EPs
Starship Entertainment EPs